Marine can be used as a first name, usually female. Notable people with the name include:
 Marine Bolliet (born 1988), French biathlete
 Marine Boyer (born 2000), French artistic gymnast
 Marine Brenier (born 1986), French politician
 Marine Brevet (born 1994), French gymnast
 Marine Cano (born 1954), American soccer player-coach
 Marine Charrette-Labadie, French social and political activist
 Marine Dafeur (born 1994), French association football player
 Marine De Nadaï (born 1988), French rugby union player
 Marine Debauve (born 1988), French gymnast
 Marine Deleeuw (born 1994), French model
 Marine Delterme (born 1970), French actress
 Marine Fauthoux (born 2001), French basketball player
 Marine Friesen (born 1988), a Brazilian Christian singer and songwriter
 Marine Fukuda (born 2004), a member of Japanese pop group Camellia Factory
 Marine Ghazaryan (born 1985), Armenian sprinter
 Marine Hedge, American murder victim of serial killer Dennis Rader, the BTK Strangler
 Marine Hugonnier (born 1969), a French and British filmmaker and contemporary artist
 Marine Jahan (born 1959), French actress
 Marine Joatton (born 1972), French sculptor and painter
 Marine Johannès (born 1995), French basketball player
 Marine Jurbert (born 1992), French trampolinist
 Marine Karapetyan (born 1991), Armenian soccer player
 Marine Le Pen (born 1968), French lawyer and politician
 Marine Lorphelin (born 1993), French actress and model
 Marine Miroux (born 1977), French architect
 Marine Oussedik (born 1967), French artist
 Marine Partaud (born 1994), French tennis player
 Marine Petit (born 1992), French artistic gymnast
 Marine Petrossian, Armenian poet, essayist and columnist
 Marine Quiniou (born 1993), French cyclist
 Marine Renoir (born 1987), French actress and model
 Marine Tanguy (born 1989), French art writer
 Marine Vacth (born 1991), French actress and model
 Mariné Russo (born 1980), Olympic hockey player from Argentina

French feminine given names